Blechnum, known as hard fern, is a genus of ferns in the family Blechnaceae, subfamily Blechnoideae, according to the Pteridophyte Phylogeny Group classification of 2016 (PPG I). Two very different circumscriptions of the genus are used by different authors. In the PPG I system, based on Gasper et al. (2016), Blechnum is one of 18 genera in the subfamily Blechnoideae, and has about 30 species. Other sources use a very broadly defined Blechnum s.l., including accepting only two other genera in the subfamily. The genus then has about 250 species. In the PPG I circumscription, the genus is mostly neotropical,  with a few southern African species.

Description 
Plants in the genus Blechnum (as circumscribed in the PPG I classification) are mainly terrestrial or grow on rocks; few are epiphytes. Their rhizomes may be upright or creeping and have scales with entire margins or at most a few very small teeth. They generally form stolons, which is a characteristic of the genus. The sterile and fertile fronds are usually of the same form or at most slightly different. The blades of the fronds are of one colour and are usually pinnatisect or unipinnate, rarely entire. The leaf veins are usually free, dividing one to three times, each ending near the frond margin in an enlarged tip. The sori have indusia (scale-like coverings).

Species 

Using the PPG I circumscription, the Checklist of Ferns and Lycophytes of the World accepted the following species and hybrids.

Blechnum anthracinum R.C.Moran
Blechnum appendiculatum Willd.
Blechnum arcuatum J.Rémy ex Fée
Blechnum areolatum V.A.O.Dittrich & Salino
Blechnum asplenioides Sw.
Blechnum auriculatum Cav.
Blechnum australe L.
Blechnum austrobrasilianum de la Sota
Blechnum × caudatum Cav.
Blechnum × confluens Schltdl. & Cham.
Blechnum × falciculatum C.Presl
Blechnum gracile Kaulf.
Blechnum gracilipes (Rosenst.) M.Kessler & A.R.Sm.
Blechnum guayanense A.Rojas
Blechnum hastatum Kaulf.
Blechnum heringeri Brade
Blechnum laevigatum Cav.
Blechnum lanceola Sw.
Blechnum × leopoldense (Dutra) V.A.O.Dittrich & Salino
Blechnum longipilosum V.A.O.Dittrich & Salino
Blechnum ludificans Herter
Blechnum malacothrix Maxon & Morton
Blechnum meridense Klotzsch
Blechnum occidentale L.
Blechnum × pampasicum de la Sota & M.L.Durán
Blechnum polypodioides Raddi
Blechnum punctulatum Sw.
Blechnum tomentosum M.Kessler & A.R.Sm.

References

Further reading 
 Huxley, A., ed. (1992). New RHS Dictionary of Gardening. Macmillan
 Moore, D. M. (1983). Flora of Tierra del Fuego

External links 

 Trees and shrubs in the Andes of Ecuador: Blechnum

Blechnaceae
Fern genera
Taxa named by Carl Linnaeus